Ronald "Ron" Winans (June 30, 1956 – June 17, 2005) was an American Gospel singer who gained fame as a member of The Winans.

Biography

Early years
Ronald Winans was born the second of 10 children to David and Delores Winans.

Musical and business career

The Winans
He was a member of The Winans, which consisted of Ron and three of his younger brothers: Marvin, Carvin and Michael. The Winans were discovered by Andrae Crouch. They released their first album in 1981, entitled Introducing The Winans.

Winans' family and friends
Winan's vocals contributed to five albums that were Grammy winners. In 2005, Winans' final CD was released, Ron Winans Family & Friends V: A Celebration.

Death
In 1997, Winans recovered from a heart attack.

Winans died June 17, 2005, due to heart complications at Harper Hospital in Detroit. He had been admitted for observation after doctors discovered that he was retaining fluid.

References

1956 births
2005 deaths
Burials at Woodlawn Cemetery (Detroit)
American gospel singers
Singers from Detroit
Grammy Award winners
American performers of Christian music
20th-century American singers
Winans family
20th-century African-American musicians